Natural Obsessions is a book written by American science author Natalie Angier published in 1988. It chronicles a year in the laboratories of two prominent cancer biologists during a period where there was a race to discover and characterize some of the first cancer-causing and cancer-suppressing genes.

Overview
It chronicles the time, about a year, that she spent in the labs of two very prominent cancer biologists, Robert Weinberg and Michael Wigler, during a period where there was a race to discover and characterize some of the first cancer causing and cancer-suppressing genes (oncogenes and tumor suppressor genes, respectively). This book gives insight into the day-to-day working of a top scientific laboratory with no embellishment - both the excitement and thrill of discovery as well as the drudgery and politics can be found in Natural Obsessions. Pressure to find these genes mounts and everyone is scrambling to be the first to announce this major discovery which could have gone to several laboratories.

Commercial and critical reception
Natural Obsessions was reviewed favorably in the New York Times and Smithsonian magazine in the months after its initial publication. The book was named a New York Times Notable Book for 1988.

As of 2001, the book has been used as a text in a cancer biology course at the University of Chicago and the University of Houston.

Editions
Natural Obsessions, Natalie Angier, Houghton Mifflin, 1988, 394 pp.
Natural Obsessions, Natalie Angier, Warner Books, 1989
 , 420 pp.
Natural Obsessions, Natalie Angier, Virago, 2000

References

External links
Natalie Angier: Natural Obsessions: Synopsis

1988 non-fiction books
Biology books
Science books
Houghton Mifflin books